John Alberto Nava Carvajar (born 6 October 1978) is a male professional road racing cyclist from Venezuela.

Major results

1999
 5th Overall Vuelta a Venezuela
2002
 3rd Road race, National Road Championships
 6th Overall Vuelta a Venezuela
2003
 2nd Road race, National Road Championships
2005
 3rd Overall Vuelta al Estado Portuguesa
1st Stages 1 & 2a
2006
 1st Overall Clásico Virgen de la Consolación de Táriba
 1st Overall Vuelta al Estado Yaracuy
1st Stage 2
 1st Stage 2b Vuelta al Oriente
 1st Stage 10 Vuelta a Venezuela
2007
 1st Stage 1 Vuelta Internacional al Estado Trujillo
2009
 1st Overall Vuelta Ciclista Aragua
1st Stage 2
 5th Overall Vuelta al Estado Portuguesa
2010
 Vuelta al Táchira
1st Stages 1 (TTT) & 10
 4th Overall Tour de Guadeloupe
2011
 1st Stage 12 Vuelta al Táchira
 1st Stage 5 Tour de Guadeloupe
 7th Overall Vuelta a Venezuela
2012
 5th Overall Vuelta a Venezuela
 2014
 1st  Overall Tour de Guadeloupe
1st  Combination classification
1st Stage 8b (ITT)
 3rd Overall Vuelta a Venezuela
 9th Overall Vuelta al Táchira
2015
 9th Overall Vuelta al Táchira
1st Stage 7
2018
 1st Stage 7 Vuelta a Venezuela
 4th Overall Tour de Guadeloupe
2019
 6th Overall Tour de Guadeloupe

External links

 

1978 births
Living people
Venezuelan male cyclists
Vuelta a Venezuela stage winners
People from Guasdualito